Aragón Sat was a Spanish television show owned and operated by Corporación Aragonesa de Radio y Televisión.

External links
www.aragontelevision.es

Defunct television channels in Spain
Aragón TV
Television channels and stations established in 2007